Aintree Village is a civil parish in Sefton, Merseyside, England.  It contains six buildings that are recorded in the National Heritage List for England as designated listed buildings, all of which are listed at Grade II.  This grade is the lowest of the three gradings given to listed buildings and is applied to "buildings of national importance and special interest".  The parish is a residential area to the north of Liverpool.  It contains the Aintree Racecourse, and the Leeds and Liverpool Canal.  The listed buildings consist of houses, a stand on the racecourse, and a bridge crossing the canal.

References

Citations

Sources

Listed buildings in Merseyside
Lists of listed buildings in Merseyside